Neoregelia subg. Longipetalopsis is a subgenus of the genus Neoregelia.

Species
Species accepted by Encyclopedia of Bromeliads as of October 2022:

Neoregelia altocaririensis 
Neoregelia azevedoi 
Neoregelia bahiana 
Neoregelia bragarum 
Neoregelia brigadeirensis 
Neoregelia brownii 
Neoregelia dayvidiana 
Neoregelia diversifolia 
Neoregelia gigas 
Neoregelia ibitipocensis 
Neoregelia inexspectata 
Neoregelia kerryi 
Neoregelia longipedicellata 
Neoregelia menescalii 
Neoregelia mucugensis 
Neoregelia paulistana 
Neoregelia pernambucana 
Neoregelia retrorsa 
Neoregelia rothinessa 
Neoregelia rubrovittata 
Neoregelia silvimontana  (as Neoregelia silvomontana)
Neoregelia tenebrosa 
Neoregelia viridolineata 
Neoregelia viridovinosa

References

Plant subgenera